Mirinaba cadeadensis is a species of air-breathing land snail, a terrestrial pulmonate gastropod mollusk in the family Strophocheilidae. This species is endemic to Brazil.

References

Strophocheilidae
Endemic fauna of Brazil
Gastropods described in 1952